Ibrahim Shiyam (born 3 February 1982) is a Maldivian footballer nicknamed "Dhona" or "Kuda Thoddoo".

Club career
Shiyam started his career at Victory Sports Club in 2001 and was nominated for the Haveeru footballer of the year award in his debut season. He continued playing for Victory until moving to Club Valencia in 2009, but also played a season at Island FC in the year 2004.

He then moved to New Radiant for the 2010 season and after spending a couple of seasons at the club, he signed to VB Sports Club. His contract with VB did not last long, he moved to Maziya after appealing to terminate his contract with VB before the 2012 season started, without playing a single game.

International career
Shiyam represented Maldives in FIFA World Cup qualification matches.

Personal life
Shiyam is the younger brother of former Maldives national football team captain Mohamed Nizam.

References

External links
 
 
 Ibrahim Shiyam (Dhona) at maldivesoccer.com

1982 births
Living people
Maldivian footballers
Maldives international footballers
Club Valencia players
New Radiant S.C. players
Victory Sports Club players
People from Thoddoo
Association football forwards
Footballers at the 2002 Asian Games
Asian Games competitors for the Maldives